2,6-Dimethylnaphthalene (2,6-DMN) is a polycyclic aromatic hydrocarbon. It is one of the ten dimethylnaphthalene isomers, which are derived from naphthalene by the addition of two methyl groups.

Synthesis
Alkylated naphthalenes (methyl-, dimethyl-, and poly-methyl naphthalenes, thus including 2,6-DMN) are found in low concentrations in crude oil and coal tar. Separation is difficult, expensive, and requires a number of operations such as selective crystallization and adsorption, in addition to any isomerization reactions. Alternative routes to 2,6-DMN remains of interest.

In the "alkenylation process" butadiene (1), o-xylene (2), and Sodium-potassium alloy (3) are used, which react to form 5-(ortho-tolyl)pent-2-ene (OTP, 3). OTP is subsequently cyclized to 1,5-dimethyltetraline (4). Dehydrogenation then provides 1,5-dimethylnaphthalene (1,5-DMN, 5). Finally, 1,5-DMN is isomerized to 2,6-DMN (6). In the final step, other mono-, di-, and tri-methylnaphthalenes are formed. More work is therefore required in separation of the mixture, which is done by selective crystallization.

Applications
2,6-Dimethylnaphthalene is mainly used for the preparation of 2,6-naphthalenedicarboxylic acid by oxidation of 2,6-dimethylnaphthalene in the liquid phase. 2,6-Naphthalenedicarboxylic acid is a monomer for the production of high-performance polymers, in particular poly (ethylene-2,6-naphthalene dicarboxylate) or shorter polyethylene naphthalate (PEN). That polyester is stronger and has a higher thermal resistance than the more frequently used polyethylene terephthalate (PET).

2,6-Dimethylnaphthalene undergoes ammoxidation to give the 2,6-dicyanonaphthalene, which can be hydrogenated to bis(aminomethyl)naphthalene, a precursor to dyes.

References

Aromatic hydrocarbons
Naphthalenes